Bungarus candidus, commonly known as the Malayan krait or blue krait, is a highly venomous species of snake. The blue krait is a member of the genus Bungarus and the family Elapidae.

Description

Dorsally, it has a pattern of 27–34 dark-brown, black, or bluish-black crossbands on the body and tail, which are narrowed and rounded on the sides. The first crossband is continuous with the dark color of the head. The dark crossbands are separated by broad, yellowish-white interspaces, which may be spotted with black. Ventrally, it is uniformly white.

An unbanded black phenotype also occurs in some populations, reportedly in West and Central Java.

The smooth dorsal scales are arranged in 15 rows, with the vertebral row much enlarged. The ventrals number 195–237; the anal plate is entire; and the single (undivided) subcaudals are 37–56 in number.

Distribution and habitat
It is found in Southeast Asia from Indochina south to Java and Bali in Indonesia.

Venom
In mice, the intravenous  for this species is 0.1 mg/kg. Its mortality rate is 60–70% in untreated humans. The amount of venom injected is 5 mg, while the lethal dose for a 75kg human is 1 mg

References
 Das, Indraneil (2010). A Field Guide to the Reptiles of South-East Asia. New Holland Publishers. 

Specific

External links
 B. candidus at Thailand Snakes

candidus
Snakes of Asia
Reptiles of Cambodia
Reptiles of Indonesia
Reptiles of Laos
Reptiles of Malaysia
Reptiles of Thailand
Snakes of Vietnam
Reptiles described in 1758
Taxa named by Carl Linnaeus